EcoPark may refer to:
 Birmingham EcoPark, an environmental education centre, Birmingham, England
 EcoPark (Hong Kong), an industrial park for waste recycling and environmental engineering
 Ecopark (Vietnam), an urban township development on the outskirts of Hanoi
 Edmonton EcoPark, a waste-to-energy plant in Edmonton, London
 Kuakata Ecopark, Kalapara Upazila, Patuakhali District, Bangladesh
 La Mesa Ecopark, a public park in Quezon City, Metro Manila, Philippine

See also
 Eco Park (disambiguation)
 Eco-industrial park